The 2010 Chief Financial Officer General election took place on November 2, 2010, to elect the Chief Financial Officer of Florida. The election was won by Jeff Atwater who took office on January 4, 2011.

Republican

Democratic

References

Chief Financial Officer
Florida Chief Financial Officer
Florida Chief Financial Officer elections